Puerto Teresa Río Yata is a newly built community located in the northeast region of the Beni Department on the Bolivian PacificAtlantic highway and at the Yata River, a tributary of the Beni River. It is part of the community of Santa Rosa de Yacuma in the José Ballivián Province of the Beni Department. It was founded on September 17, 1991.

External links 
 Photo Puerto Teresa Río Yata

Populated places in Beni Department